Robert III (800–834), also called Rutpert, was the Count of Worms and Rheingau of a noble  Frankish family called the Robertians. It has been proposed that he was the son of Robert of Hesbaye.

Biography
By his wife, Waldrada, he had, Robert the Strong. 

His first cousin was Ermengard, wife of the Frankish emperor Louis the Pious. His cousin Chrodogang was Archbishop of Metz and abbot of the Lorsch Abbey. 

An uncle of Robert was Count Cancor, founder of Lorsch Abbey. Through Robert the Strong he was grandfather of two kings of Western Francia, Odo and Robert.

References

Sources
 

800 births
834 deaths
Robertians
9th-century French people